Hwang Chang-shik (born 8 June 1943) is a former South Korean cyclist. He competed in the individual road race at the 1964 Summer Olympics.

References

External links
 

1943 births
Living people
South Korean male cyclists
Olympic cyclists of South Korea
Cyclists at the 1964 Summer Olympics
Place of birth missing (living people)